The Château Borély is a chateau in the southern part of Marseille, France.

History
The chateau was built in the eighteenth century for Louis Borély (1692-1768), a rich merchant of Marseille. It was donated to the city in the nineteenth century. For several years it hosted the archaeological museum. The chateau is located in the current Parc Borély.

There are plans to transfer the Faïence Museum (Musée de la Faïence de Marseille) from the Château Pastré to the Château Borély, which will also hold the planned Museum of Decorative Arts and Fashion, as part of preparations for Marseille becoming the European cultural capital in 2013.

References
Citations

Sources

 Adrien  Blés, Dictionnaire historique des rues de Marseille, Éd. Jeanne Laffitte, Marseille, 1989, p. 61, .
 Roger Duchêne, Christian Ramade, Le Château Borély, Éd. Autres Temps, 1999,

External links

 Marseille Envues    
 Site de la ville de Marseille

Borely
Houses completed in 1778
Museums in Marseille